The 1931 Milan–San Remo was the 24th edition of the Milan–San Remo cycle race and was held on 22 March 1931. The race started in Milan and finished in San Remo. The race was won by Alfredo Binda.

General classification

References

1931
1931 in road cycling
1931 in Italian sport
March 1931 sports events